Ludovica "Louisa" Ghijs (19 March 1902 – 18 July 1985) was a Belgian stage actress. She was married to Dutch-German actor Johannes Heesters. 

Ghijs met Heesters in 1928, they married in 1930, and had two daughters Wiesje (1931), nowadays a pianist in Vienna, and Nicole (1937) who became an actress. One of her grandchildren is also an actress: Saskia Fischer (born 1966).
In 1935, she played in her last movie, De vier Mullers, alongside her husband. She died in Bavaria, Germany.

Popular culture
Ghijs was the inspiration for Wiske ("Suzy") in the Belgian comic series Suske en Wiske (English: Spike and Suzy).

References

1902 births
1985 deaths
Belgian stage actresses
Belgian musical theatre actresses
Actresses from Brussels
20th-century Belgian actresses